Lieutenant Edgar Gardner Tobin was a World War I flying ace credited with six aerial victories.

World War I service
Tobin was born to a prominent San Antonio family and was educated at Texas Military Institute. While he served in the 94th and 103rd Aero Squadrons, he scored all his victories while flying for the 103rd. From 11 July to 28 September 1918, he scored six confirmed victories and an unverified one; one of his wins was shared with fellow ace George W. Furlow. Tobin ended the war with the Distinguished Service Cross and the Croix de Guerre.

Post World War I
In 1928, he took over an aerial mapping firm, which became instrumental in surveying the State of Texas and thus enabled the development Texas oil industry. During the Second World War, Tobin served as a civilian aide to General Henry "Hap" Arnold of the United States Army Air Corps.  He died in the crash of a Grumman Mallard on 10 January 1954 on Lake Wallace, Louisiana  along with one of the co-founders of Braniff International Airways, Thomas Elmer Braniff.

See also

 List of World War I flying aces from the United States

References

Bibliography
 American Aces of World War I. Norman Franks, Harry Dempsey. Osprey Publishing, 2001. , .

1896 births
1954 deaths
Military personnel from San Antonio
TMI Episcopal alumni
United States Army Air Forces officers
United States Army Air Service pilots of World War I
Recipients of the Distinguished Service Cross (United States)
American World War I flying aces